Pablo Vizcaíno Prado (born June 22, 1951 in Guatemala City), is a Guatemalan bishop.

References

1951 births
Living people
People from Guatemala City
20th-century Roman Catholic bishops in Guatemala
Roman Catholic bishops of Suchitepéquez-Retalhuleu